Bachir Mecheri nicknamed Baby (born July 5, 1967 in Oran) is a former Algerian international football player. He has spent the majority of his career with MC Oran.

Career
In 1985, Bachir Mecheri took part in the Palestine Cup of Nations for Youth held in Algeria with the Algeria U20 team.

Honours

Club
MC Oran
Algerian Championship: 1987–88, 1991–92, 1992–93; Runner-up: 1984–85, 1986–87, 1989–90, 1999–00
Algerian Cup: 1984–85
Algerian League Cup Runner-up: 1999–00
Arab Super Cup: 1999
African Cup of Champions Clubs Runner-up: 1989

MC Alger
Algerian League Cup: 1997–98

Career statistics

International matches
Below the list of the international matches played by the player.

References

1967 births
Living people
Algerian footballers
Algeria international footballers
Footballers from Oran
MC Oran players
MC Alger players
Association football forwards
21st-century Algerian people